Reto Berra (born 3 January 1987) is a Swiss professional ice hockey goaltender who is currently playing for HC Fribourg-Gottéron of the National League (NL). Berra played seven seasons in Switzerland's National League A, spending time with the GCK Lions, HC Davos and SCL Tigers before joining EHC Biel in 2009 where he was the team's starting goaltender for four years.  He was an NHL draft pick of the St. Louis Blues, selected in the fourth round of the 2006 NHL Entry Draft and was traded to the Calgary Flames, with whom he made his NHL debut in 2013–14. Internationally, Berra has played with the Swiss National Team on several occasions; he has appeared in two World Championships. At the 2013 tournament, he shared goaltending duties with Martin Gerber and helped lead Switzerland to a silver medal, the nation's first medal in 60 years.

Playing career

Berra played youth hockey in his home town of Bülach, where he became a goaltender full-time at age 11. He played in the 2001 Quebec International Pee-Wee Hockey Tournament with a youth team from Zürich.

Berra played his first professional game in 2003–04 in the National League B (NLB) for GCK Lions, and two years later played his first National League A (NLA) games with ZSC Lions. He caught the attention of the St. Louis Blues during the 2006 World Junior Ice Hockey Championships, and the team selected him with their fourth-round pick, 106th overall, at the 2006 National Hockey League (NHL) Entry Draft. Berra opted to remain in Switzerland, where he was the backup goaltender for the Lions, SCL Tigers and HC Davos. He was a member of HC Davos' Swiss championship team in 2009.

Moving to EHC Biel for the 2009–10 NLA season, Berra became the team's starting goaltender and appeared in 40 games, posting a win–loss record of 16–20 and a goals against average (GAA) of 3.36. He improved over the following seasons, culminating in 2011–12 when he was named the NLA's goaltender of the year after posting a 23–26 record with Biel and a 2.45 GAA. As he played with Biel in the 2012–13 NLA season, Berra's NHL playing rights were traded by the Blues on 1 April 2013.  The Calgary Flames acquired his rights, along with Mark Cundari and a first-round draft selection, in exchange for defenceman Jay Bouwmeester.

After completing his fourth season with Biel, Berra believed his career had progressed to the point where he could succeed in North America. He signed a one-year contract with Calgary for the 2013–14 NHL season. The Flames wanted Berra to gain playing experience in North America and assigned him to their American Hockey League (AHL) affiliate, the Abbotsford Heat to start the season. After nine appearances with the Heat in which he recorded a 2.66 GAA, and a .908 save percentage, Berra was recalled to Calgary.  Berra made his NHL debut on 3 November 2013, making 42 saves for his first win as the Flames defeated the defending Stanley Cup champion Chicago Blackhawks, 3–2.

Berra appeared in 29 games for the Flames and posted a 9–17–2 record with a 2.95 GAA. On 5 March 2014, the Flames traded him to the Colorado Avalanche in exchange for a second-round draft pick. Before making his debut with the Avalanche and as an impending free agent at season's end, Berra was signed to a three-year contract extension to assume the backup role to Semyon Varlamov on 13 March 2014.

On 16 January 2015, while playing for the Lake Erie Monsters, Berra became the 11th goalie in AHL history to score a goal when he shot the puck the length of the ice to score in an empty net against the Chicago Wolves.

Approaching the final year of his contract and having been surpassed to third choice on the depth chart by Calvin Pickard, Berra was traded by the Avalanche to the Florida Panthers in exchange for Rocco Grimaldi on 23 June 2016. In the following 2016–17 season, as the Panthers third-string option as was assigned to inaugural AHL affiliate, the Springfield Thunderbirds. Berra led the Thunderbirds with 12 wins in 31 games and was recalled to the Panthers to play out the regular season, appearing in 7 games.

On 11 February 2017, Berra agreed to a three-year contract with HC Fribourg-Gottéron of the National League for a reported worth of CHF 3.5 million. The contract would start from the 2017–18 season. On 5 July 2017, it was announced that Berra had used his NHL out clause in securing a one-year, one-way contract with the Anaheim Ducks. The remaining two years of his contract with Fribourg-Gottéron would remain valid.

Upon completing the 2017–18 season, having appeared in 5 games with the Ducks primarily as the club's third-string goaltender, Berra was announced to return to HC Fribourg-Gottéron to begin the previously agreed contract on 1 May 2018.

On 22 August 2019, Berra was signed to a four-year contract extension with Fribourg worth CHF 3.2 million through the 2023/24 season.

International play
 

Berra has represented Switzerland at several international tournaments.  He played with the national junior team three times; the first was at the 2005 IIHF World U18 Championships where Berra appeared in two games, winning one, for the ninth place Swiss. He also played in two World Junior Championships, appearing in all six of his nation's games each in 2006 and 2007 as Switzerland finished seventh both years. With the senior team, Berra appeared in four of his nation's seven games at the 2012 IIHF World Championship where he posted a record of 1–3 and had a GAA of 3.01.

At the 2013 IIHF World Championship, Berra split goaltending duties with Martin Gerber.  Berra appeared in four games, winning all four and posting a GAA of 1.00. The unheralded Swiss team went on a "Cinderella run" at the championship, winning their first nine games of the tournament. The ninth win came in the semi-final as Berra led his team to an upset win over the United States. He recorded a shutout in a 3–0 win that guaranteed the Swiss their first World Championship medal in 60 years. Berra described the victory: "I think it's the biggest win since a long, long time for Switzerland, and also, I think for a lot of players, it was the most important game in their life today." The tournament ended in disappointment for the Swiss as, with Gerber in goal, they lost the gold medal game, 5–1 to Sweden. The silver medal matched the best finish in Swiss history.

Hiller and Berra returned to the Swiss team for the 2014 Winter Olympics. Berra appeared in one of Switzerland's four games, a 1–0 defeat.

Career statistics

Regular season and playoffs

International

References

External links

 Reto Berra at hockeysfuture.com

1987 births
Abbotsford Heat players
Anaheim Ducks players
Calgary Flames players
Colorado Avalanche players
EHC Biel players
HC Davos players
Florida Panthers players
HC Fribourg-Gottéron players
Lake Erie Monsters players
Living people
Olympic ice hockey players of Switzerland
Ice hockey players at the 2014 Winter Olympics
Ice hockey players at the 2022 Winter Olympics
St. Louis Blues draft picks
San Antonio Rampage players
San Diego Gulls (AHL) players
SC Langnau players
Springfield Thunderbirds players
Swiss ice hockey goaltenders
People from Bülach
ZSC Lions players
EV Zug players
Sportspeople from the canton of Zürich